Rumeysa Hayrıdil Aredba (born Princess Hatice Aredba;  1873 -  1927) was an Abkhazian princess. She was a lady-in-waiting to Nazikeda Kadın, wife of Mehmed VI, the last Sultan of the Ottoman Empire. She is known for writing memoirs, which give details of the exile, and personality of Sultan Mehmed at San Remo.

Life
Rumeysa Hanim was born as Hatice in 1873 in Abkhazia. She was a member of the Abkazian princely family, Aredba. Her father was Prince Halil Bey Aredba. She had an elder sister Amine Seten who was renamed Nazikeda, and married to Şehzade Yusuf Izzeddin, and a younger sister, Pakize Hanım, married to Esad Bey, a Hungarian.

In 1876, she had been brought to Istanbul as a young child, where she was entrusted to the imperial harem. She was then sent to Cemile Sultan's palace in Kandilli, where her name according to the custom of the Ottoman court was changed to Rumeysa Hayrıdil Hanim. After her cousin Emine who had been renamed Nazikeda, married Şehzade Vahideddin (future Sultan Mehmed VI) in 1885, she became senior lady-in-waiting to her.

She spent most of her life with the family of Sultan Mehmed. At the exile of the imperial family in 1924, she accompanied them to San Remo. During the exile she wrote memoirs which give details of the exile, and personality of Sultan Mehmed, by the name of Sultan Vahdeddinin San Remo Günleri. After Mehmed's death in 1926, she returned to Istanbul, where she died of cancer in 1927.

See also
Leyla Achba
Şahinde Hanım

References

Sources

1870s births
1929 deaths
20th-century women writers from the Ottoman Empire
People from the Ottoman Empire of Abkhazian descent
Ladies-in-waiting of the Ottoman Empire
19th-century women from the Ottoman Empire
20th-century memoirists
Emigrants from the Russian Empire to the Ottoman Empire